Casiopea World Live '88 is the fifth live album released by the jazz fusion group Casiopea in 1988. It is a compilation Album consisting of recordings of some of their songs played in concert during Casiopea's World Tour in 1988 that promoted their previous album "Euphony". It is also a collaboration album with two Japanese horn sections from two other bands, the brass section of "Spectrum" and the brass Section of "The Tops". Additionally, it is the first album Spectrum recorded since their breakup in 1981, and is their penultimate album (their last album after they broke up was released in 1991 and was a remix compilation album of songs that were hits in Japan from the late 1970s). Lead trumpeter/vocalist of Spectrum, Ichiro Nitta, was also the Producer of "The Tops" at the time this album was released. Tops released one more album, "Soul Children", the following year, before they disbanded in 1991. This was also the last album to feature Tetsuo Sakurai on Bass and Akira Jimbo on Drums (during his run as a full-time member), who both left to form the band Jimsaku.

Track listing

LP(28MX-2555) Track listing

CD(POCH-1223, UPCY-6540) Track listing

12, 13 bonus truck are not included in H33P-20285.

Personnel
Casiopea are
Issei Noro - electric guitar, acoustic guitar
Minoru Mukaiya - keyboards
Tetsuo Sakurai - 6 string electric bass
Akira Jimbo - drums

Guest Musicians
Horn Arrangement - Ichiro Nitta (LP:A1, B5)(CD:1,10,11,12,13)

Horn Spectrum are
Ichiro Nitta - trumpet
Junichi Kanezaki - trumpet
Toshiyuki Yoshida - trombone

Tops Horns are
Shigeru Terauchi - trumpet
Junichi Kawasaki - trumpet
Takashi Kudo - trombone
Masahiro Kuroishi - tenor saxophone

Production
Producer - Issei Noro
Executive producer - Katsuki Hagiwara, Shinichi Toyama

Recorded on
July 9th (Projeto Sp. São Paulo, Brazil) [LP:A3, A4] [CD:3,4]
August 23rd (World Expo 88, Brisbane, Australia) [LP:A5] [CD:5]
August 27th (Yomiuriland Open Theater East, Tokyo, Japan) [LP:A1,A2,B5] [CD:1,2,10,11,12,13]
September 10th (Auditorio National, Mexico City, Mexico)  [CD:6,7]
September 13th (Roxy, Los Angeles, U.S.A.) [LP:B3,B4] [CD:8,9]

Recording engineers - Roberto Marques (Brazil), Steve Pyle (Australia), Bob Hodas (U.S.A.), Tsutomu Ueda (Mexico), and Akitsugu Doi (Tokyo)
Mixing engineer - Akitsugu Doi, Tutomu Ueda
Assistant engineer - Masashi Kudo
Tour supervisor - Shinichi Toyama
Top Producer - Noboru Miura
Project co-ordinator - Masato Arai
Tour management - Fumiaki Takahashi
Tour crew - Ichiro Gohara, Tsutomu Ueda, Katsuhiro Maruichi, Kazumasa Mitsui, Hideji Uekusa, Hisashi Aratake.
Art director - Yoshiyuki Menjoh
Designer - Yuji Sugita
Photograph - Nakao Wada, Kazumi Okuma, Eiryo Asada
Hair and makeup - Kaoru Chiba

Release history

External links

LD/DVD 

JOIA - Casioea World Tour - is the live video released by the jazz fusion group Casiopea in 1989.
Later on, it was released on DVD with the name Live History Part II.

Track listing

LD(SM068-3290)収録曲

Personnel
Casiopea are
Issei Noro - Electric guitar, Acoustic Guitar
Minoru Mukaiya - Keyboards
Tetsuo Sakurai - 6 Strings Electric Bass
Akira Jimbo - Drums

Guest Musicians
Horn arrangement - Ichiro Nitta (2-2〜4,2-6)

Horn Spectrum are
Ichiro Nitta - trumpet
Junichi Kanezaki - trumpet
Toshiyuki Yoshida - trombone

Tops Horns are
Shigeru Terauchi - trumpet
Junichi Kawasaki - trumpet
Takashi Kudo - trombone
Masahiro Kuroishi - tenor saxophone

Production
 Director - Hideaki Oguri
 Producer - Ryoichi Okuda (L.D.C.), Shunsuke Goth (TAMCO)
 Technical supervisor - Makoto Kagawa, Kiyoshi Yaezawa
 Video editor - Susumu "FRYO" Iguchi, Hideaki Oguri
 Sound mixing engineer - Akitsugu Doi
 Supervisor - Shinichi Toyama (Aura Music)
 Tour producer - Noboru Miura (Soreisha)
 Tour management - Fumiaki Takahashi
 Assistant director - Kiyoji Yoshino, Atsushi Kimura
 M.A. engineer - Takami Yuasa
 Sound mixing assistant - Masashi Kudo
 Production assistant manager - Hiroshi Mizutani
 Runner - Kenichi Matsumoto
 Assistant editor - Kohei Ishizaki
 Edit co-ordinator - Kouichi Umeda
 Stylist - Reiko Shishi
 Designer - Mitsuaki Takeda (L.D.C.)
 Tour co-ordinator - Masato Arai
 Tour crew - Katsuhiro Maruichi, Ichiro Gohara, Tsutomu Ueda, Kazumasa Mitsui, Hideji Uekusa, Hisashi Aratake

Brazil staff 
 Sup operações - M. Lucena
 Dir tecnico - N. Cagiano
 Sup tec - Carlos A. Fonseca
 Co-dir - Simoes
 Cameraman - Shigeru Mikoshiba, Carlinhos, Michell, Di Nizo, Marcelo, Leonard Yamaguchi
 Video engineer - Kazuhiro Nagame, Pedro, Valdir, Luizinho, Baldini, Robson
 AssistanttTecnico - J. Servulo
 Camera assistant - Paulo, Hamilton
 Aux mecs - Erco
 Sound recording engineer - Roberto Marques, João Roberto Guarino
 Sound assistant engineer - Jose Alberto Pimentel, Carlos Guedes, Dijalma Silva
 Illumination - Walter, L. Fernando, Claudio, Arnaldo
 Video mobil -  TV Bandeirantes 
 Audio Equipments -  Transamerica
 Co-ordination - Nambei Tshushin Sha, Gisaburo Owa, Marina Satoh, Leonard Yamaguchi
 Tour Co-ordination - Hallelujah World, Toshiharu Masanobu, Makio Terao

Australia staff 
 Co-producer - Kei Robards
 Co-director - Malcom Kemp.
 Technical director - G. Nettle, B. Cassidy
 Switcher - P. Lesson
 Cameraman - Makoto Kogawa, Glen Watson, Steve Cahill, Brian Barnard, Bob McCall, Greg Clark
 Video engineer - Barry Sutherland, G. Venn, C. Koeneman, J. Waiter, J. Galea, I. Andrews
 VTR - Craig Metcalfe, D. Webb
 Sound recording engineer - Steve Pyle, J. Boast
 Sound recording assistant - G. Son
 Assistant director - K. Wilson
 Lighting - J. Bosak
 Video and audio mobile - TVO (Network Ten), Video Ten
 Co-ordination - West Street Productions, Tom Kanazaki, Jinni Hazard

Japan staff 
 Technical director - Kiyoshi Yaezawa
 Chief cameraman - Makoto Kogawa
 Cameramen - Joji Ide, Shigeru Mikoshiba, Dave Kajimoto, Tsutomu Akahira, Shinichi Chiba, Jun Kosaka, Masato Ishikawa, Yoji Miyazaki, Teruo Ito, Akio Suzaki, Hiroshi Watanabe (Com-remote)
 Video engineer - Masaru Konno, Akiyoshi Serino, Kazuhiro Nagame, Yoshitaka Kenkou, Hiroyuki Toida
 VTR - Hisaki Fukuda, Takashi Suzuki
 Switcher - Hirohito Ikemoto
 Camera assistant - Fumito Kotani, Hiroshi Oyama, Junichi Yokoyama, Katsunori Ikemoto, Mitsunori Kishizoe
 Rail and crane system - Hiroshi Iwasaki, Kozo Nashiki, Kazuya Nakamura, Yutaka Oshima, Shigeru Hirayama, Toshihiro Nakamura, Katsuo Ito, Shinji Kanzaki, Koji Kanaya
 Sound recording engineer - Akitsugu Doi
 Sound recording Assistants - Yoshiyasu Kumada, Makoto Takahashi, Tomoyasu Yamashita, Shoji Kusunoki
 P.A. - Tsutomu Ueda, Kimio Kurokawa
 Stage art pranner - Kazunori Higuchi
 Lighting director - Ichiro Gohara
 Lighting - Yukihisa Nishimura
 Stage manager - Katsumi Ninagawa, Masayuki Yagi, Seiji Ohashi
 Location lighting - Kouichi Seo, Tsugio Mizuno

Mexico staff 
 Cameraman - Makoto Kagawa
 Video engineer - Kazuhiro Nagame
 Sound recording engineer - Tsutomu Ueda
 Co-director - Oscar J. Vera Mendez
 Video system - TV Imevision
 Co-ordinator - Setsuo Morishima
 Stage manager - Ryuichi Masamura

U.S.A. Staff 
 Technical director - Mike Harrington
 Technical co-ordinator - Steve North
 Cameraman - Guy Casagrande, George Prince, Joe Dallura, Dave Kister, Doug Frobie, Makoto Kagawa
 Gaffer - Marx Misenhiemer
 Video engineer - Bill Schwartz, Terry Baysdofer, Jon Karhan, John Karhan
 Camera assistant - Engine Fitzpatrick
 Sound recording engineer - Bob Hodas, Video Mobil, Video One, Audio Mobile, Record Plant
 Co-ordination - Muru Okuda (Filmore International)
 Associates co-ordination - Alvin Mori, Ron Martinez (Lumination)

Release history

External links
 
 LaserDisc Database Casiopea: Joia - World Tour 1988 (1988) (SM068-3290)

Full Live 
Aside from Casiopea Perfect Live II, all Casiopea lives officially released are cut. 

Some songs are missing from the official release. Since the released album is a compilation of multiple concerts across the world, we don't have the setlists for all of them.

We do have the setlist for the concert held in Yomuri Land in Japan, from this concert were picked "Hacker", "Bayside Express", "Solid Swing", "Do-Loo-Doo?", "Access", "Super Sonic Movement", "Halle", "Bridge Over Troubled Water" and "Asayake". Those songs come from the second part which was for the promotion of Casiopea's latest albums, Platinum and Euphony. 

The first part was the "Sake No Kawanobori Medley", made up of one song from each Casiopea album at the time, going from the newest Sun Sun to the oldest Casiopea.

First Part

Second Part

References

Casiopea live albums
1988 live albums
Casiopea video albums
1988 video albums
Live video albums